Howard Jones (born February 10, 1990) is a former American football outside linebacker. He played college football at Shepherd University.

Professional career

Pittsburgh Steelers
Jones signed with the Steelers as an undrafted rookie free agent on May 10, 2014. He was released on September 5, 2015.

Tampa Bay Buccaneers
Jones was signed to the Tampa Bay Buccaneers practice squad on September 7, 2015. He was elevated to the team's main roster on October 6. During his first game against the Jacksonville Jaguars the following Sunday, he recorded 2 solo sacks. Two weeks later, against the Washington Redskins, he added a 43-yard fumble return touchdown. In Week 8 against the Atlanta Falcons, Jones recorded another sack which resulted in a fumble.
Jones finished his first season with the Buccaneers with five sacks.

Jones was placed on injured reserve on November 7, 2016 after suffering a knee injury.

Chicago Bears
On October 6, 2017, Jones was signed to the Chicago Bears' practice squad. He was promoted to the active roster on November 23, 2017. On November 30, 2017, he was waived by the Bears and re-signed to the practice squad. He was promoted back to the active roster on December 5, 2017.

On May 14, 2018, Jones was released by the Bears.

References

External links
Tampa Bay Buccaneers bio

1990 births
Living people
American football linebackers
American football defensive ends
People from Woodbridge, Virginia
Shepherd Rams football players
Pittsburgh Steelers players
Tampa Bay Buccaneers players
Chicago Bears players